Open Educational Practices in Australia refers to the development, implementation and use of Open educational resources (OER), open access (research and data), open learning design, open policies, and Massive Open Online Courses (MOOCs) to open up education in Australia.

History 
In Australia, Open Educational Practices (OEP) started around 1998, when some of the first open access initiatives were introduced and supported by the Australian government. In 2002, the open access movement had a substantial boost due to a programme funded by the Australian government called “Backing Australia’s Ability”. This programme was aimed broadly at promoting excellence in research, science and technology, but several initiatives attached to this programme played important roles in the progress of open access in Australia. They assisted in: raising awareness about open access; building research information infrastructure, including university repositories of open data, thesis and other digital objects; establishing metadata standards to improve access and discoverability of research information; and developing related guidelines.

Transformation of OEP Realised in Australia 
Although the opportunities and benefits of OEP have been realised by the Australian government through investments in open access and by the VET and schools sectors, it was only in 2010 — almost 10 years after the movement emerged in other parts of the world (i.e., the MIT OpenCourseWare Consortium in 2001) — that it started getting more popular in higher education.

It was during this period that the Office for Learning and Teaching funded a two-year research project, which resulted in the report "Adoption, Use and Management of Open Educational Resources in Australia Higher Education".

One of the main deliverables of this project was the “Feasibility Protocol for OER and OEP” (Bossu, Brown, & Bull, 2014b), which is a set of guiding principles that prompts questions and raises issues to be considered by educational institutions wishing to experiment with OER and OEP. The protocol attempts to assist higher education leaders to make informed decisions about the adoption of OER and OEP at several levels within the institution, from management to individuals, including academics and students. The Feasibility Protocol addresses four topics: the opportunities that OER and OEP could bring to institutions and broader society; the challenges associated with OER and OEP adoption; considerations surrounding the institutions’ strategic directions for an effective adoption of OER and OEP; and policy recommendations for higher education institutions in Australia.

Another contribution of the two-year research project in helping the sector realise the opportunities of OER for higher education in Australia was the organisation of the first National Symposium on OER, held in August 2012 in Sydney. A range of stakeholders representing 21 national and international institutions (including higher educational institutions, VET and government bodies) attended the symposium. The symposium was a key dissemination strategy for this project, and a chance for the stakeholders to meet and discuss issues related to open education, opportunities for collaboration, and ways to together overcome some of these concerns.

Scope of Transformation of OEP in Australia 
The scope of the transformation of OEP in Australia is best understood by looking at the main initiatives, programmes and activities categorised into five themes: collaboration; resources and infrastructure; open policies; learning and teaching; and research.

Collaboration 
Collaboration amongst institutions and countries is recognised as one of the opportunities of the transformative potential of open education. An example of this collaboration is the OERu, which is a consortium of currently 39 international educational institution partners, spread across five continents. In Australia, six universities are part of this network: University of Canberra, University of Southern Queensland, University of Wollongong, Charles Sturt University, Curtin University and the University of Tasmania. The OERu’s vision is to make education accessible to everyone. Co-ordinated by the OER Foundation, it is an independent, not-for-profit network that offers free online courses for students worldwide. It also provides affordable ways for learners to gain academic credit towards qualifications from recognised institutions.

Resources and infrastructure 
Several Australian universities have invested in resource production and in the development and improvement of technological infrastructure. Examples of resource production are initiatives such as MOOCs. Following the international trend, a number of Australian universities have joined the major MOOC providers, including edX, Coursera and the British FutureLearn, while others have developed their own MOOCs. Currently, more than 100 Australian MOOCs are on offer.

These are mostly free online courses and are likely to approach learning and teaching more traditionally (xMOOCs) instead of being truly open and adopting open pedagogies and open learning ecosystems (including cMOOCs). In Australia, only a few MOOCs have been developed with some open aspects. For instance, the content might be openly licensed, but the learning management system (LMS) where the courses are hosted is a proprietary system and requires learners to register. Some institutions are still investing in this space, but the initial hype about MOOCs seems to have faded to some extent in Australia.

Open policies 
Encouraged by recent OEP initiatives taking place nationally and internationally, some Australian universities have realised that they need to review and, as needed, further develop their related policies in order to enable innovation and maintain a competitive edge. According to Scott, intellectual property policies are currently under review at several Australian universities. Other universities have encouraged the adoption of OEP through supporting documentation, such as university strategic plans and teaching performance reviews. An example of such a development is the Technology Enhanced Learning and Teaching White Paper 2014–2018, developed by the Tasmanian Institute of Learning and Teaching at the University of Tasmania.

Learning and teaching 
Although it could be assumed that the examples above might all impact learning and teaching, there are some programmes specifically targeting learning and teaching for OEP. Most universities experimenting with OEP in Australia have some form of academic development activities to build internal capacity. These activities are in the form of workshops, webinars, one-on-one consultancies and online resources produced by the institutions or adopted/adapted from elsewhere. One example is the “Curriculum Design for Open Education,” which is an open and online professional development micro-course focused on developing the capacity of academics to adopt OEP as the basis for innovative, engaging and agile curricula.

Universities and their library departments are increasingly creating OER publishing platforms and services for academics to create and publish their own open resources. Examples include the La Trobe eBureau and several PressBooks-based publishing services.

Research 
Research in OEP has been conducted as part of some of the projects and initiatives in Australia. Postgraduate students in several institutions have also undertaken research, and could very well be the Australian OEP advocates and researchers of the future.

See also 
 Open access in Australia
 Open educational resources in Canada
 Open access in New Zealand

Sources

References 

Free content from UNESCO
Open educational resources
Educational materials
Educational technology
Education in Australia
Distance education in Australia